This is a list of public holidays in French Guiana.

Below are jour chômé d'usage holidays.

References

Lists of public holidays by country
French Guiana
French Guiana
French Guiana
Guiana